Ezza North is a local government area in Ebonyi State Nigeria. Its headquarters is at Ebiaji town. It has an area of 305 km and a population of 145,619 at the 2006 census. Ezza North created in 1996 alongside other LGAs in the then new Ebonyi State used to be part of old Ezza Local Government Area. It is a predominant Igbo town inhabited by the Ezza and the Orring people of Idzem (Amuda) and Okpolo (Okpomoro) extraction. Since her creation Ezza North has been on the part of progressive development under Ebonyi State Government dominated by PDP.

The postal code of the area is 482.

External links
 List of Districts of Ezza North:

References

Local Government Areas in Ebonyi State
Populated places in Ebonyi State